The Carla Bley Big Band Goes to Church is a live album by American composer, bandleader and keyboardist Carla Bley recorded in Perugia, Italy as part of the Umbria Jazz Festival and released on the Watt/ECM label in 1996.

Reception
The Allmusic review by Stacia Proefrock awarded the album 4½ stars and stated "The Carla Bley Big Band Goes to Church is a perfect showcase for the forward-thinking compositions and arrangements of Carla Bley... Not quite as experimental as her earlier compositions, this album manages, regardless to be among her best work in the '90s". The Penguin Guide to Jazz awarded it 3⅓ stars stating "The best Bley album since Fleur Carnivore? "  The JazzTimes review by Willard Jenkins said "the music bears resemblance to what one might expect from an enlightened 21st century church service".

Track listing
All compositions by Carla Bley except where noted.
 "Setting Calvin's Waltz" - 23:51  
 "Exaltation/Religious Experience/Major" (Carl Ruggles/Bley/Bley) - 9:33  
 "One Way" - 8:29  
 "Beads" - 8:27  
 "Permanent Wave" - 10:07  
 "Who Will Rescue You?" - 7:52

Personnel
Carla Bley - piano 
Lew Soloff, Guy Barker, Claude Deppa, Steve Waterman - trumpet
Gary Valente, Pete Beachill, Chris Dean - trombone 
Richard Henry - bass trombone
Roger Janotta - flute, soprano saxophone, alto saxophone 
Wolfgang Puschnig - alto saxophone  
Andy Sheppard, Jerry Underwood - tenor saxophone 
Julian Argüelles - baritone saxophone  
Karen Mantler - organ, harmonica  
Steve Swallow - bass guitar  
Dennis Mackrel - drums

References

ECM Records live albums
Carla Bley live albums
1996 live albums